"(Looking for) The Heart of Saturday Night" is a song by Tom Waits on his 1974 album The Heart of Saturday Night.

Background
After completing the album Closing Time, Waits toured with Frank Zappa. At this period, Waits started to write and compose the album The Heart of Saturday Night, basing it around the writing style and thematic elements of Jack Kerouac. The song itself is a melancholy reflection of exploring the city streets at night.

Cover versions
(Looking for) The Heart of Saturday Night has been covered by such musicians as Holly Cole, Shawn Colvin, and Madeleine Peyroux.

Personnel
Listed personnel cited from linear notes:
Tom Waits - vocals, guitar
Jim Hughart - double bass
Jim Gordon - percussion

References

1974 songs
Tom Waits songs